Iñigo Córdoba Querejeta (born 13 March 1997) is a Spanish professional footballer who plays as a left winger for Dutch club Fortuna Sittard.

Club career
Born in Bilbao, Biscay, Basque Country, Córdoba joined Athletic Bilbao's youth setup in 2009, aged 12. He made his debuts as a senior with the farm team in the 2014–15 campaign, in Tercera División.

In summer 2015, Córdoba spent the whole pre-season with the reserves, newly promoted to Segunda División. On 12 September of that year he made his professional debut aged 18, coming on as a late substitute for Aitor Seguín in a 0–1 away loss against Real Valladolid; he started seven of his 21 appearances in the second tier, and remained with the B-team after their relegation at the end of the season.

After a year as a regular starter in the third level, Córdoba signed a new contract until 2021, and was invited to train with the senior side in the 2017 pre-season. He made his first team – and La Liga – debut on 20 August, replacing Mikel Balenziaga in a 0–0 home draw against Getafe CF. He scored his first goal in a domestic league fixture away to Villarreal CF on 9 April 2018, the opener in a 3–1 victory for his team. Before the end of the season he signed an extension to his contract, including a buyout clause of upwards of €30 million, running until June 2022.

On 1 February 2021, Córdoba joined Deportivo Alavés on loan for the remainder of the 2020–21 season. On 31 August, he moved abroad for the first time in his career, after agreeing to a one-year loan deal with Dutch Eredivisie side Go Ahead Eagles.

Upon returning to Athletic, Córdoba terminated his contract with the club on 7 July 2022. On 22 July, he returned to the Netherlands and signed a two-year deal with Fortuna Sittard.

International career
Having initially been called up to the Spain under-21 squad by coach Albert Celades in October 2017, the following month Córdoba made his debut at that level, coming on as a half-time substitute for Mikel Oyarzabal and scoring within eight minutes of his introduction in an eventual 5–1 victory over Slovakia on 14 November 2017, in a qualifier for the 2019 UEFA European Under-21 Championship.

Personal life
Córdoba has two brothers who are also footballers. His older sibling Aitor (born 1995) is a central defender who graduated from the youth setup at SD Leioa and played in the second division with Burgos CF. Asier, the youngest of the three (born 2000) is also a winger, and was also groomed at Athletic Bilbao. Their sister Ainhoa (born 2001) plays for Leioa's women's team in the Basque regional league.

Career statistics

Club

References

External links
 
 

1997 births
Living people
Spanish footballers
Footballers from Bilbao
Association football wingers
La Liga players
Segunda División players
Segunda División B players
Tercera División players
CD Basconia footballers
Bilbao Athletic footballers
Athletic Bilbao footballers
Deportivo Alavés players
Eredivisie players
Go Ahead Eagles players
Fortuna Sittard players
Spain youth international footballers
Spain under-21 international footballers
Spanish expatriate footballers
Spanish expatriate sportspeople in the Netherlands
Expatriate footballers in the Netherlands